Cleveland Ballet was founded in Cleveland in 2014 by Gladisa Guadalupe and Michael Krasnyansky. It is the third incarnation of a Cleveland Ballet, having been preceded by establishments of the same name founded in 1935 and 1972. Guadalupe, an alumna of the School of American Ballet and a former principal dancer, serves as artistic director, and Krasnyansky, a Ukrainian American businessman, serves as president & CEO.

History and growth 
In October 2015, Cleveland Ballet's inaugural season debuted with the ballet Past. Present. Future. at Playhouse Square, characterized by The Plain Dealer as a "stylistically diverse and entertaining" production. The company continued with a production of Coppélia in May 2016, described as "evidence of a company eager and able to do great things", with the dancers' performances as "mostly excellent".

By its second season, 2016–2017, the ballet had grown to fourteen members. It concluded the season with a performance of A Midsummer Night's Dream, which was reviewed as featuring "smartly-crafted, deceptively difficult, and wonderfully illustrative choreography".

Cleveland Ballet became Playhouse Square's resident classical ballet company in 2017, during its third season. This designation resulted in additional marketing funds, access to more rehearsal space, and priority in scheduling.

In 2017, Cleveland Ballet also reintroduced regular holiday performances of Tchaikovsky's ballet, The Nutcracker, as a seasonal tradition in Cleveland—the first Nutcracker production by a local company at Playhouse Square since 1999. Additional performances of the season included the 1909 ballet, Les Sylphides, as well as Alice, a new ballet based on Lewis Carroll's book Alice in Wonderland.

In the fourth season, 2018–2019, the company increased to 20 professional dancers. In addition to The Nutcracker, Cleveland Ballet presented Fall Collection and Coppélia as main stage productions at Playhouse Square.

In its fifth season, 2019–2020, the ballet grew to 25 dancers, performing Carmen at the Ohio Theatre in October  and offering 12 performances of The Nutcracker at the Hanna Theatre in December. The season was cut short by the COVID-19 pandemic in Spring 2020, requiring the cancellation of the company's planned performance of Mozart's The Magic Flute.

Productions

References 

Ballet companies in the United States
Ballet schools in the United States
2014 establishments in Ohio
Culture of Cleveland
Performing groups established in 2014
Dance companies
Dance companies in the United States
Ballet-related lists